Priscilla J. Smith is an American attorney, notable for her advocacy for reproductive rights in the United States. She is currently employed as a Clinical Lecturer and Program Director for the Study of Reproductive Justice at The Yale Law School. She previously served as an attorney and U.S. Legal Program Director at the Center For Reproductive Law & Policy.

Notable Work 
Smith gained fame for her role in the landmark Supreme Court case Gonzales v. Carhart. She argued on behalf of abortion provider LeRoy Carhart to challenge the constitutionality of the Partial-Birth Abortion Ban Act, a federal law banning the practice of intact dilation and extraction. The Supreme Court, in the majority opinion authored by Justice Anthony Kennedy, upheld the law and ruled against Carhart.

She also argued in Ferguson v. City of Charleston against nonconsensual drug testing for obstetrics patients at Medical University of South Carolina. The women who were tested positive were often arrested and imprisoned on child abuse charges. The Supreme Court ruled that the forced drug tests were unconstitutional and a violation of the Fourteenth Amendment.

Education 
Smith received her J.D. from Yale Law School in 1991 and her B.A. from Yale College in 1984.

References

External links
Oyez.org profile

American lawyers
American abortion-rights activists
Living people
Year of birth missing (living people)
Yale College alumni
Yale Law School alumni